Antonia Louise Antoniazzi (born 5 October 1971) is a Welsh Labour Party politician. She was elected as the Member of Parliament (MP) for Gower at the 2017 general election.

Early life
Antoniazzi was born and raised in Llanelli by a Welsh mother and a Welsh–Italian father. She attended St John Lloyd Catholic Comprehensive School and Gorseinon College. After studying French and Italian at Exeter University, she gained a Postgraduate Certificate in Education (PGCE) from Cardiff University.

She has been head of languages at Bryngwyn Comprehensive School in Llanelli. She won nine caps as a prop forward for the Wales women's national rugby union team.

Parliamentary career
Antoniazzi contested the regional seat of Mid and West Wales in the 2016 National Assembly for Wales election. She then stood for parliament at the 2017 general election for the Gower constituency, which was held at the time by the Conservative's Byron Davies with a 27-vote majority, making it the UK's most marginal seat. She was successful, turning the seat Labour by gaining a 3,269 majority. On her election, she stated that she intended to be a strong constituency MP, and that "Gower is and always will be my first priority".

Antoniazzi delivered her maiden speech on 29 June 2017. In her speech she outlined how Italian immigration had shaped cafe culture in Wales and the UK.

Antoniazzi is Chair of the All Party Parliamentary Groups on Medical Cannabis under Prescription and on Cancer.

In June 2019, Antoniazzi urged ministers to allow the use of medical cannabis by "all who need it", citing the case of 12-year-old Billy Caldwell whose epilepsy was alleviated through use of the drug.
Also in June 2019, Antoniazzi securing a debate in parliament about the health risks of electromagnetic fields, particularly 5G technology, in which she asked the government to commit to ensuring that Public Health England informed the public that all radio frequency signals are a possible human carcinogen. She was subsequently accused in The Guardian of spreading "junk science".

In the 2019 General Election, Antoniazzi was returned as the MP for Gower with a smaller majority. In the subsequent Labour leadership election, Antoniazzi nominated Jess Phillips.

Brexit 
Antoniazzi has served as the Parliamentary Private Secretary to the Shadow Secretary of State for Northern Ireland (2017–2018) and the Shadow Secretary of State for Wales (2018) before resigning.
On 13 June 2018, Antoniazzi and five other Labour MPs resigned their roles as frontbenchers for the Labour Party in protest at Labour's Brexit position. Leader Jeremy Corbyn had instructed his MPs to abstain in a vote which Britain would remain in the single market by joining the European Economic Area (EEA). The MPs resigned and voted in favour of the EEA.

In the series of Parliamentary votes on Brexit in March 2019, Antoniazzi voted against the Labour Party whip and in favour of an amendment tabled by members of The Independent Group for a second public vote.

LGBT+ rights 
In October 2021, Antoniazzi criticised the LGBT charity Stonewall, stating the Welsh government had promoted an "ideological culture" and were "dictated to by Stonewall".

Antoniazzi has met with Fair Play for Women, Woman's Place UK and Transgender Trend.

In January 2022, Antoniazzi and four other Labour delegates to the Parliamentary Assembly of the Council of Europe tabled ten amendments to Resolution 2417, "Combating rising hate against LGBTI people in Europe". The amendments sought to include the word "sex" alongside gender identity, de-conflate the situation in the UK from Hungary, Poland, Russia and Turkey, and remove references to alleged anti-LGBTI movements in the UK. The delegates were criticised by Pink News for removing references to anti-LGBTI attacks in the UK, a condemnation of anti-trans movements and a call to withdraw funding from anti-LGBTI groups or authorities; in turn the delegates were defended by Debbie Hayton, a gender-critical activist, for protesting the removal of sex-essentialist language she considered important for non-trans women.

Personal life
Antoniazzi has a son.

References

External links

1971 births
Living people
21st-century British women politicians
Alumni of Cardiff University
Alumni of the University of Exeter
British politicians of Italian descent
Female members of the Parliament of the United Kingdom for Welsh constituencies
People educated at Gorseinon College
People educated at St John Lloyd Catholic Comprehensive School
People from Llanelli
Rugby union players from Llanelli
UK MPs 2017–2019
UK MPs 2019–present
Wales international rugby union players
Welsh female rugby union players
Welsh Labour Party MPs
Welsh people of Italian descent
Welsh rugby union players